Tondwal is a clan of Sursaini with origins in the Punjab region.  Tandwal/tanduwal are a branch of Tondwal.  This is a very large Saini clan.  This clan live in the Indian states of Punjab, Haryana, Jammu and Kashmir, Himachal Pradesh, and also in the towns of Chandigarh and Delhi.  This clan also overlap with other castes and clans, including Rajput, Sisodia, and Kumavat Kshatriya.

See also
Caste system in India

Punjabi tribes
Saini